Helsinki Seagulls is a professional basketball team, based in Helsinki, Finland. The club is playing in the Korisliiga, the highest tier of basketball in Finland.

The Seagulls were founded in 2013 and made its debut in the Korisliiga in 2014, after promoting in its first season. The team has won the Finnish Cup three times.

History
The team was established in 2013 and it acquired its place on the second level of Finnish basketball in Division I A after the dissolution of the Torpan Pojat men's team. The license of Torpan Pojat was then transferred to the Gulls, along with the remaining players. 

The Seagulls opened their 2013-2014 season in the Division I A with winning 10 matches in a row. The team won a total of 25 of their 28 regular season games placing first in their division with Josh Gonner leading their offense with an impressive 20.5 points per game. Seagulls earned the promotion to Korisliiga after dismissing first Tampereen Pyrintö II and then BC Nokia in the division playoffs.

Honours 
Korisliiga

 Third place (4): 2017, 2018, 2021, 2022

Finnish Cup

 Winners (3): 2020, 2021, 2022

Season by season

Arena 

The Seagulls play their home games in the Töölö Sports Hall.

Players

Current roster

Depth chart

Notable players

 Tuukka Kotti
 Carl Lindbom
 Antti Kanervo
 Gerald Lee Jr.
 Jason Conley
 Raymond Cowels III

References

External links
Official website 
2018-19 Korisliiga team page 

Basketball teams established in 2013
Basketball teams in Finland
Sports clubs in Helsinki
2013 establishments in Finland